Janez Graffenhueber  was a politician of the late 17th century and early 18th century in Slovenia, when the country was under the Holy Roman Empire. He became mayor of Ljubljana in 1699. He was succeeded by Gabriel Eder in 1702.

References

Mayors of places in the Holy Roman Empire
Mayors of Ljubljana
Year of birth missing
Year of death missing
17th-century Carniolan people
18th-century Carniolan people